The Rhode Island Department of Administration, RIDOA,  is a department level agency of the Government of Rhode Island.

Functions and responsibilities
The RIDOA's responsibilities include the development and administration of the $7.5 billion State budget; determining and maintaining standard specifications for purchases, contracts, bids and awards for State purchases; maintenance and upkeep and procurement of State facilities; administration of the statewide planning program and overall personnel administration and management of State departments and agencies and the negotiation of State employee union contracts.

The department, headed by the Director of Administration, has seventeen programmatic functions. The functions include Legal Services, Accounts and Control, Purchasing, Auditing, Human Resources, Budgeting, Facilities Management, Personnel Appeal Board, Information Technology, Capital Projects and Property Management, General Appropriations, Energy Resources, Library and Information Services, Planning, Debt Service Payments and Internal Services Programs.

Divisions run by the Department
The Rhode Island Department of Administration is separated into nine divisions and offices:
Office of Management and Budget
Division of Human Resources
Division of Information Technology
Division of Purchases
Division of Legal Services
Office of Accounts and Control
Office of Capital Asset Management and Maintenance 
Division of Planning 
Office of Diversity, Equality, and Opportunity

See also
Government of Rhode Island
Rhode Island Department of Transportation
Rhode Island Department of Corrections
Rhode Island Department of Children, Youth & Families

References

External links
Guide to Department of Administration Division of Accounts and Control State Highway Program fiscal records from the Rhode Island State Archives
Technical Paper Number 126: Highway Jurisdiction in Rhode Island from the Rhode Island State Archives
Listing of Year-Round Mobile Home Parks in Rhode Island from the Rhode Island State Archives
Merit System of Personnel Administration from the Rhode Island State Archives
Rhode Island Community Shelter Plan from the Rhode Island State Archives
The Olneyville Expressway Providence, Rhode Island: What, Why, How, Where from the Rhode Island State Archives

State agencies of Rhode Island